The Samoa national under-23 football team, also known as Samoa U-23, represents Samoa at U23 tournaments. The team is considered to be the feeder team for the Samoa national football team and is controlled by the Football Federation of Samoa.

History
Samoa U23 made two appearances so far at the OFC U23 Championship, in 1999 and 2004. They never reached further than the Group Stage. In 2019 they will participate again.

OFC 
The OFC Men's Olympic Qualifying Tournament is a tournament held once every four years to decide the only qualification spot for Oceania Football Confederation (OFC) and representatives at the Olympic Games.

Fixtures & Results

Current squad
The following players were called to the squad for the 2019 OFC Men's Olympic Qualifying Tournament from 21 September - 5 October 2019.
Caps and goals updated as of 27 September 2019 after the match against .

List of coaches
  Desmond Fa'aiuaso (2019)

See also
 Samoa national football team
 Samoa national under-20 football team
 Samoa national under-17 football team

References

Oceanian national under-23 association football teams
under-23